Up-regulated gene 4, also known as URG4, is a human gene.

References

Further reading